Peter Christopher (born 1948, Cyprus) is an Australian author and photographer who writes about shipwrecks and riverboats. He is also a Director of the not for profit organisation, Clipper Ship City of Adelaide  Ltd (CSCOAL), set up to save the 1864 clipper ship, City of Adelaide.

Peter is the author of seven books, co-author of another and co-editor of another.  Australia's large collection of original operating paddle steamers has been the subject of three decades of research by Peter, and hence the subject of two of his seven books.

Since 1967, Peter has been an active scuba diver and volunteer maritime archaeologist who has visited and documented wrecks in South Australia (SA) in particular, but also around Australia. Peter's contribution to maritime archaeology was recognised by an Award presented to him by the Australian Government in 1982 and by the award of a life membership by the Society for Underwater Historical Research in 2000.

In 1973, Peter was a member of the South Australian Government's inquiry into scuba diving deaths in fresh water sink-holes and underwater caves in the south east of SA.  The Report of the Committee "appointed to investigate safety precautions for Scuba Divers in Fresh Water Sink Holes and Underwater Caves" which was presented to the Government in January 1974 essentially recommended non-legislative response to the problem.  The subsequent voluntary program of regulation via diver training and certification has been carried out by the Cave Divers Association of Australia.  The success of the program is evident with nearly four decades of low fatality cave diving following the implementation of the Report's recommendations.

Peter Christopher is a Justice of the Peace for South Australia.

He is not a full-time author; he worked as a senior Trade Union official, with his role until mid June 2015 being the Chief Industrial Officer of the Public Service Association of South Australia. He retired to focus on a volunteer role developing a seaport village for the historic 1864 clipper ship "City of Adelaide' in Port Adelaide's inner harbour.

Bibliography 
Shores of Tragedy: shipwrecks of South Australia. (Christopher.P) OCLC: 27527347, published by Peter in 1987, details the ten most commonly dived wrecks in South Australia.
Divers Guide to South Australia. (Christopher.P)  OCLC: 27626745 published by Peter in 1988
" ...to save the lives of strangers" (Famous Shipwrecks of South Australia) (Christopher.P)  OCLC: 27626764, which was published in 1989, describes the history of SA's most famous wrecks. Its title comes from a newspaper account of the rescue of the survivors of the Admella shipwreck in 1859.
South Australian Shipwrecks. A Data Base 1802–1989. (Christopher.P), published by the Society for Underwater Historical Research firstly as a paperback in 1990 and then as a PDF in 2006 OCLC: 25914190 is a listing of all wrecks during that period.
Paddlesteamers and Riverboats of the River Murray. (Christopher.P), published by Axiom, 2000 OCLC: 222744595.
Let's go for a Dive, 50 years of the Underwater Explorers Club of SA, edited by Peter Christopher with Nicholas Cundell and published in 2004 OCLC: 223893318.
Australian Riverboats. A Pictorial History. (Christopher.P), published by Axiom, 2006 OCLC: 224952174.
Australian Shipwrecks. A Pictorial History. (Christopher.P), published by Axiom, 2009 OCLC: 458275141.
Clipper Ship City of Adelaide - Fun, facts & figures. (Reardon.M & Christopher.P) 2018

References

Further reading
 "This DEH Heritage Webnote is an online version of information originally published as Heritage Information Leaflet 1.12."
 National Library of Australia. References to titles by author. http://catalogue.nla.gov.au/Record/4704916
 State Library of South Australia. SA Shipwrecks. http://www.catalog.slsa.sa.gov.au/record=b1121616
 Adelaide Now. City of Adelaide campaign http://www.adelaidenow.com.au/news/south-australia/new-hope-for-city-of-adelaide/story-e6frea83-1225823784827
 Adelaide Now (Advertiser Newspaper) Peter Christopher article re prison overcrowding.  http://www.adelaidenow.com.au/the-hard-cell-to-fix-our-prison-system/comments-e6frea6u-1225982606927
 Queensland Government. Immigration, seamen and shipwreck information. https://web.archive.org/web/20110216131003/http://www.slq.qld.gov.au/info/fh/seamen_wrecks
 Adelaide Advertiser.15 Aug 2011. Prison overcrowding, Peter Christopher statements. http://www.adelaidenow.com.au/news/breaking-news/warning-as-prison-system-clogged-at-record-levels/story-e6frea73-1226115026332

 External links 
 Peter Christopher's personal web site 
 City of Adelaide Clipper ship site  
 ABC Online. Peter Christopher discusses shipwreck Loch Vennachar  http://www.abc.net.au/backyard/shipwrecks/sa/transcript_vennachar.htm
 Baird Maritime. British PM petitioned to save City of Adelaide. http://www.bairdmaritime.com/index.php?option=com_content&view=category&layout=blog&id=41&Itemid=139&el_mcal_month=4&el_mcal_year=2009&limitstart=5
 The long running campaign to save the historic 1864 composite clipper City of Adelaide has been successful, with an announcement by Scottish Culture and External Affairs Minister Fiona Hyslop on 28 August 2010 that Adelaide was successful in its bid for the ship. Peter Christopher was the Convenor of the July 2000 Adelaide meeting which established the campaign to save the ship. http://www.adelaidenow.com.au/news/south-australia/famed-clipper-adelaide-finally-coming-home-from-scotland/comments-e6frea83-1225911307313 and http://www.theaustralian.com.au/news/nation/city-of-adelaide-clipper-ship-ready-to-sail-to-its-namesake/story-e6frg6nf-1225911612679
 University of the 3rd Age, Adelaide. Tutor profiles. http://www.adelaideu3a.on.net/AboutUs.htm
 Flinders University. Archaeology from Below. Speakers List 2008. http://ehlt.flinders.edu.au/conferences/archaeology/presenters.html
 Article regarding Volunteers by Peter Christopher as Chief Industrial Officer of the Public Service Association of South Australia. https://books.google.com/books?id=1WE519K9xk0C&pg=PA134&lpg=PA134&dq=peter+christopher+shipwrecks&source=bl&ots=4vYUj3l9b1&sig=GRc_iErZiKMYa2TH6R6a3v9xJ7E&hl=en&ei=1dVLTeiNO4WEvAOEh73mDw&sa=X&oi=book_result&ct=result&resnum=4&ved=0CCEQ6AEwAzg8#v=onepage&q=peter%20christopher%20shipwrecks&f=false
 Traditional Boats and Tall Ships Magazine article regarding the 1864 ship "City of Adelaide".  http://tallship.typepad.com/my_weblog/2009/11/sos-city-of-adelaide.html
 Sunday Mail news item with Peter Christopher comments regarding shipping containers being inappropriate to use as prison cells. http://www.adelaidenow.com.au/think-outside-box-for-prison-cells/story-e6frea6u-1226095987275
 Irvine Herald article with Peter Christopher comments regarding the preparation to move the historic "City of Adelaide". http://www.irvineherald.co.uk/ayrshire-news/local-news-ayrshire/local-news-irvine/2012/03/02/sit-in-ship-protest-won-t-sink-carrick-s-oz-move-75485-30425891/
 BBC report re "City of Adelaide" and quotes by Peter Christopher.  https://www.bbc.co.uk/news/uk-england-tyne-17433173
 ABC TV report regarding "City of Adelaide", including interview with Peter Christopher. http://www.abc.net.au/news/2012-08-03/fight-over-ships-return/4176324?section=sa
 Portside Messenger interview with Peter Christopher regarding "City of Adelaide" clipper ship. http://digitaledition.portsidemessenger.com.au/#folio=6
 Adelaide TV interview with Peter Christopher re moving clipper ship City of Adelaide. 
The Australian. Ship movement interview. http://www.theaustralian.com.au/news/breaking-news/historic-clipper-to-head-to-adelaide/story-fn3dxiwe-1226703053046
 Adelaide Advertiser. Ship movement story. http://www.adelaidenow.com.au/news/south-australia/historic-city-of-adelaide-clipper-ship-in-final-voyage-to-south-australia-in-state-tourist-coup/story-fni6uo1m-1226703027404?sv=22e733411446a2a15e542a5a40ff5370#.Uhfx0Mr6nzg.email
 BBC Glasgow. Ship movement interview. https://www.bbc.co.uk/news/uk-scotland-glasgow-west-23802192
 BBC Sunderland. Opposition to movement of ship by local enthusiast. https://www.bbc.co.uk/news/uk-england-tyne-23807329
 Messenger Press. Announcement of clipper ship City of Adelaide'' arrival date in Adelaide. http://www.adelaidenow.com.au/messenger/west-beaches/city-of-adelaide-clipper-ship-leaves-netherlands-on-final-journey-to-south-australia/story-fni9llx9-1226766323216
 Adelaide Advertiser interview with Peter Christopher on retirement. http://www.adelaidenow.com.au/news/south-australia/lunch-with-peter-christopher/story-fni6uo1m-1227405692829
 Portside Messenger article with Peter Christopher quoted re historic ship 'City of Adelaide'. . http://www.adelaidenow.com.au/messenger/west-beaches/greatgrandaughter-of-clipper-ships-first-captain-makes-five-figure-donation/news-story/b04c7e4835cb01b07762cf0f702a34d3
 Portside Messenger 10 January 2018 interview re moving historic ship "City of Adelaide". http://www.adelaidenow.com.au/messenger/west-beaches/news-story/baa3d68e0c91191cb66d8e434bab6072
 Portside article 14 March 2018 Book launch. http://messenger.smedia.com.au/portside-weekly/shared/ShowArticle.aspx?doc=MPSW%2F2018%2F03%2F14&entity=Ar01302&sk=F37FD373

Living people
1948 births
Australian historians
Australian maritime historians
Australian underwater divers
People from South Australia